The Van Nostrand Tiara is a 1913 American silent film featuring Harry Carey.

Cast
 Reggie Morris as A. J. Raffles
 Claire McDowell as Kate
 Harry Carey as Society Detective
 Hattie Delaro

See also
 Harry Carey filmography

External links

1913 films
1913 short films
American silent short films
American black-and-white films
Films directed by Anthony O'Sullivan
Works based on A. J. Raffles
1910s American films